KF Rrufeja Miletinë is a football club based in the village of Miletinë, Brvenica Municipality, North Macedonia. They are currently competing in the OFS Tetovo league.

History
The club was founded in 1993.

References

External links
Club news 
Club info at MacedonianFootball 
Football Federation of Macedonia 

Football clubs in North Macedonia
Association football clubs established in 1993
1993 establishments in the Republic of Macedonia
FK
Rufeja